Solid State Physics Laboratory (SSPL) is a laboratory under the Defence Research & Development Organization (DRDO). Located in Delhi its primary function is research in the field of Solid State Materials, Devices and Sub-systems. Their activities include development of semi-conductor materials, solid state devices, electronic components/sub-systems and investigation of solid state materials/devices for futuristic defence applications.

References

External links
 DRDO

Physics laboratories
Defence Research and Development Organisation laboratories
Research institutes in Delhi
1962 establishments in Delhi